Stony Rapids Water Aerodrome  is located on the Fond du Lac River, adjacent to Stony Rapids, Saskatchewan, Canada.

See also 
 List of airports in Saskatchewan
 Stony Rapids Airport

References

Registered aerodromes in Saskatchewan
Seaplane bases in Saskatchewan